The Garrison Place was a historic house in rural Dallas County, Arkansas.  Built c. 1861, it was a rectangular single-story braced-frame structure clad in weatherboard, and was the only 1860s house of that type in the county, exhibiting other construction features not found in any other period buildings in the county.  It was located on a dirt road 1/2 mile south of Highway 48.

The house was listed on the National Register of Historic Places in 1983.  It has since been demolished.

See also
National Register of Historic Places listings in Dallas County, Arkansas

References

Houses on the National Register of Historic Places in Arkansas
Houses completed in 1861
Houses in Dallas County, Arkansas
1861 establishments in Arkansas
National Register of Historic Places in Dallas County, Arkansas